Yashichi may refer to:

 Yashichi, a "boost power-up" icon resembling a shuriken in classic Capcom video games
 Kazaguruma no Yashichi, a character in Mito Kōmon
 Yashichi, a minor character in manga and anime Afro Samurai
 Yashichi, a ninja type fairy character in manga and anime Mirmo!